= Zhenjiang Middle School =

School in China

Coordinates: 32.1915201°N 119.41301388°E

- Traditional Chinese: 中國江蘇省鎮江中學
- Simplified Chinese: 中国江苏省镇江中学
Transcriptions
Standard Mandarin
- Hanyu Pinyin: Jiāngsūshěng Zhènjiāng Zhōngxué

Short name
- Traditional Chinese: 鎮中
- Simplified Chinese: 镇中
Transcriptions
Standard Mandarin
- Hanyu Pinyin: Zhèn Zhōng

Zhenjiang High School of Jiangsu Province, colloquially known in Chinese as Zhèn Zhōng, was established in 1892 in the city of Zhenjiang, Jiangsu Province, China. It is regarded as one of the best and the most selective Middle Schools in Zhenjiang. Zhenjiang High School of Jiangsu Province is the first national middle school in Zhenjiang.
